The 2005 Speedway World Cup Final was the fourth and last race of the 2005 Speedway World Cup season. It took place on August 6, 2005 in the Olympic Stadium in Wrocław, Poland.

Results

Heat details

Heat after heat 
 Rickardsson, H.Andersen, Screen, Walasek
 Holta, P.Karlsson, Stead, B.Pedersen
 Bjerre, Protasiewicz, Jonsson, Richardson
 Hampel, Lindbäck, Nicholls, N.Pedersen
 T.Gollob, Iversen, Lindgren, Harris
 Richardson, Lingren, Walsek, N.Pedersen(e4)
 Nicholls, Rickardson, Holta, Iversen
 H.Andersen, Protasiewicz, Harris, P.Karlsson(e4)
 Jonsson, Hampel, B.Pedersen, Screen
 T.Gollob, Bjerre, Stead, Lindbäck
 Walasek, Bjerre, P.Karlsson, Nicholls
 Holta, Jonsson, N.Pedersen, Harris
 Protasiewicz, Lidbaeck, Iversen, Nicholls(joker)-e4
 Hampel, H.Andersen, Stead, Lindgren
 Richardson, T.Gollob, B.Pedersen, Rickardsson
 Walasek, Jonsson(joker), Iversen, Stead(e3)
 Richardson, Holta, Lindbäck, H.Andersen
 Protasiewicz, B.Pedersen, Nicholls, Rickardsson
 Hampel, Rickardsson, Harris, Bjerre
 T.Gollob, N.Pedersen, P.Karlsson, Screen
 Walasek, Lindbäck, B.Pedersen, Richardson
 Holta, Stead, Lindgren, Bjerre
 Protasiewicz, N.Pedersen, Stead, Rickardsson
 Richardson, Hampel, N.Pedersen, P.Karlsson
 T.Gollob, Jonsson, Nicholls, H.Andersen

References

See also 
 2005 Speedway World Cup
 motorcycle speedway

!